Lesbian, gay, bisexual, and transgender (LGBT) persons in  Senegal face legal challenges not experienced by non-LGBT residents. Senegal specifically outlaws same-sex sexual acts and, in the past, has prosecuted men accused of homosexuality. LGBT persons face routine discrimination in society.

According to the 2013 Pew Global Attitudes Project, 97% of Senegal residents believe that homosexuality is a way of life that society should not accept, a figure unchanged from 2007.

Laws regarding same-sex sexual activity
Same-sex sexual activity is illegal in Senegal. Article 319 in the Senegalese Penal Code states the following:
Sans préjudice des peines plus graves prévues par les alinéas qui précèdent ou par les articles 320 et 321 du présent Code, sera puni d'un emprisonnement d'un à cinq ans et d'une amende de 100.000 à 1.500.000 francs, quiconque aura commis un acte impudique ou contre nature avec un individu de son sexe. Si l'acte a été commis avec un mineur de 21 ans, le maximum de la peine sera toujours prononcé.

Translated in English, Article 319 states the following::

Without prejudice to the more serious penalties provided for in the preceding paragraphs or by articles 320 and 321 of this Code, whoever will have committed an improper or unnatural act with a person of the same sex will be punished by imprisonment of between one and five years and by a fine of 100,000 to 1,500,000 francs. If the act was committed with a person below the age of 21, the maximum penalty will always be applied.

In 2016, Senegalese President Macky Sall has said he will never legalize gay sex. He said: "Never, under my authority, will homosexuality be legalized in the Senegalese lands."

Recognition of same-sex relationships
Same-sex couples have no legal recognition, whether in the form of marriage or civil unions.

Adoption of children
According to information published in July 2011 by the United States Department of State, a couple married for a minimum of five years or an unmarried person who is at least 35 years of age is eligible to adopt a Senegalese child if there is at least 15 years between the age of the child and the age of the adopting parent. Senegalese law does not specifically make LGBT persons ineligible to adopt.

Living conditions

2008
In 2008, Dakar's Icone magazine reported on and published photographs of an alleged gay marriage that had taken place in a private home in Senegal. The editor of the magazine, Mansour Dieng, claimed that he subsequently received death threats. Five men in the photographs were arrested but were later released without charge. It is not clear if the arrests stemmed from Senegal's anti-homosexuality laws or the death threats.

2009
On 19 December 2008, nine men were arrested on charges of homosexuality in a private flat in Dakar, allegedly after police received an anonymous tip. One of the arrestees was Diadji Diouf, the owner of the flat and a well-known Senegalese activist who heads AIDES Senegal, which provides HIV / AIDS prevention and treatment services to men who have sex with men. The men were repeatedly tortured while in police custody, even after they confessed to being gay. On 6 January 2009, all these men were convicted of "indecent conduct and unnatural acts" (5 years' imprisonment) and for "being members of a criminal group" (3 years' imprisonment). The judge said that AIDES Senegal was a "cover to recruit or organize meetings for homosexuals, under the pretext of providing HIV/AIDS prevention programmes". The Court of Appeals overturned the convictions in April 2009 and ordered the immediate release of the men. While incarcerated, the nine were held in special quarters because of threats from other inmates. Shortly thereafter, Imam and Member of Parliament Mbaye Niang organized a march to protest both homosexuality in general and the government intervention that allowed for the release of the men.

In January 2009, Cary Alan Johnson at the International Gay and Lesbian Human Rights Commission described "pretty consistent human rights violations ... in Senegal". But citing Dakar's recent hosting of a major conference on AIDS and sexually transmitted diseases, where "the needs of men who have sex with men were prominently featured", he said Senegal was schizophrenic in its attitudes. "There's both a movement towards progressive and inclusive culture but at the same time very, very strong movements towards oppression, specifically towards sexuality".

In mid-2009 Muslim activists created the "Front islamique pour la defense des valeurs éthiques" (The Islamic Front for the Defense of Ethical Values), advocated for homosexuals to face the death penalty. There were multiple reports around the same time of people digging up the bodies of deceased "goor-gigen" (a Senegalese term for man-woman) in cemeteries. Local and international press reported in May 2009 that the corpse of a man reputed to have been homosexual was twice disinterred from a Muslim cemetery in Thies. The first time, the body was left near the grave. After his family reburied him, the body was disinterred a second time and dumped outside his family's home.

2011
The U.S. Department of State's 2011 Human Rights Report found that,
In the recent past[,] gays, lesbians, bisexual, and transgender (LGBT) persons often faced criminal prosecution and widespread discrimination, social intolerance, and acts of violence. The media failed to report acts of hatred or violence against LGBT persons. In November 2010[,] Human Rights Watch released a report entitled "Fear of Life: Violence against Gay Men and Men Perceived as Gay in Senegal". The report discussed cases of violence against gay men and the legal and cultural milieu that fostered such violence. While the cases cited in the report were from 2009 and earlier, non-governmental organization observers speculated that the drop in cases reported during the year was due to several factors. First, violence against gay men and lesbians might have caused many LGBT persons in the country to go underground. Second, increased international attention might have caused the government to curtail prosecutions and other official discrimination. A report by the Panos Institute West Africa released on 20 July found that local media contributed to negative societal attitudes toward LGBT persons. Finally, successful legal challenges to the law used to prosecute gays and lesbians for consensual sexual activity may have helped curtail its use by prosecutors.

2012
The U.S. Department of State's 2012 Human Rights Report found that,

LGBT persons often faced arrest, widespread discrimination, social intolerance, and acts of violence [in 2012]. Senegalese ... [non-governmental organizations] worked actively on LGBT rights issues, but because of laws against homosexuality and social stigma, they maintained an exceedingly low profile. The media rarely reported acts of hatred or violence against LGBT persons. ... [L]ocal human rights groups reported that LGBT persons still faced frequent harassment by police, including arrest based only on second-hand reports and poor treatment in detention due to their sexual orientation. In January two women were arrested following the circulation of a cell phone video that showed them kissing. The incident was widely covered in local print and online media. The women were held in detention and released on bail several days later but were never formally charged with a crime. In October a court in Dakar sentenced Tasmir Jupiter Ndiaye to four years in prison and fined him 200,000 CFA francs ($400) for violating laws prohibiting "acts against nature" in addition to charges of illegal possession of arms and battery, after he purportedly refused to pay another man, Matar Diop, for sexual services. Diop was sentenced to three years in prison.

In December 2012, a gay male couple was viciously beaten near Dakar by one of the men's parents after the couple was caught having sex.

2013
While visiting Senegal in June, United States President Barack Obama called for African countries to give gays equal rights under the law. Senegal President Macky Sall responded by saying that "We are still not ready to decriminalize homosexuality." He also insisted that the country is "very tolerant" and that, "This does not mean we are homophobic." He said that countries make decisions on complex issues in their own time, noting that Senegal has outlawed capital punishment while other countries have not. He also said that, "Gays are not persecuted, but for now they must accept the choices of other Senegalese." Obama had previously been urged by the human rights group Amnesty International to use his trip around Africa to speak out against threats to gays and lesbians, which it claimed had reached dangerous levels in Africa. Before this trip, the Obama administration had been characterized as taking a "cautious" approach to the promotion of gay rights in Africa, to avoid "igniting a backlash that could endanger local activists."

2018
In September 2018, four people, two men and two women, were arrested in the capital, Dakar, by police for homosexuality after people in their neighbourhood circulated videos of them engaged in sexual acts, as part of pre-election crackdown so politicians don't seem 'pro-homosexual' for the 2019 Senegalese presidential election as local LGBT activists said. The arrest came shortly after the conviction in early September of a local chief, Cheikh Abdel Kalifa Karaboué, for drugging and raping a male co-worker. He was sentenced to four years in prison for rape and sexual acts "against nature".

Universal Periodic Reviews by the United Nations Human Rights Committee

2009
The United Nations Human Rights Committee (UNHRC) in October 2009 completed a Universal Periodic Review (UPR) of the human rights situation in Senegal. The following recommendations were made to Senegal (the country that initiated the recommendation is listed in parentheses):

Amend the Penal Code to decriminalizing [sic] homosexual activity (United Kingdom, Belgium, Canada) between consenting adults (United Kingdom) in line with the provisions of ICCPR, particularly articles 2 and 26 (Canada); remove the article of the Penal Code criminalizing sexual conduct, which is not in compliance with the Universal Declaration of Human Rights (the Netherlands); review national legislation which results in the discrimination, prosecution and punishment of people solely for their sexual orientation or gender identity (Slovenia); put an end to the legal prohibition of same-sex sexual acts or practices between consenting adults, release individuals arrested on the basis of this provision (Czech Republic); free all persons imprisoned on the grounds of their sexual orientation (Belgium); launch a national debate which may lead to the decriminalization of homosexuality (Ireland)); adopt measures to promote tolerance towards homosexuality, which would also facilitate more effective educational programmes for HIV/AIDS prevention (Czech Republic)

The UNHRC summarized Senegal's responses as follows:
In response to the statements relating to prosecutions of persons because of their sexual orientation, the head of the delegation said that homosexuality is a purely private matter, with a long history in Senegal, and is not in itself a cause for prosecution. The prosecutions referred to occurred only when the homosexual relations took place in public and were of an obtrusive nature, therefore placing them in conflict with morality and religion. Concerning decriminalization, it is necessary to take account of the culture, and avoid exacerbating the rejection of homosexuals and endangering their lives.

With regard to homosexuality, the delegation recalled that it had already given the necessary details and stated that decriminalizing homosexuality in Senegal was a complex issue that would require time and careful consideration because of the specific social factors involved.

Madické Niang, the foreign minister of Senegal, said on behalf of the Senegalese delegation on 6 February 2009:

Senegal people are not prosecuted for their sexual orientation. Sexual orientation in Senegal is a purely private matter. It is a private matter, nothing more. For many years now, we have seen homosexuality in our country and that has never led to situations where homosexuals are harassed, persecuted, or prosecuted. What has happened is that there have been situations where shocking behavior which ran counter to our religious beliefs and morality which [unintelligible] punishes unnatural sexual relations. I would ask you to understand the social realities of our country. This is an issue which is very complex. It is a very complicated issue in Senegal. Let me say once again in Senegal homosexuals lead freely ... we even had a federal republic to authorize a homosexual to have their name changed to a woman's name in order to emphasize their feminine side. No one was shocked when the president authorized the man to adopt the woman's name. But when homosexuality becomes blatantly public, it leads to embarrassing situations. You have to understand that we are a country with a particularly tolerant form of Islam. And that is why we must avoid, we must avoid the development of fundamentalism. We must ensure social cohesion. We must also take measures to protect the lives of homosexuals. That is why I ask you to bear in mind our society, our sociological realities. This is a perfectly complicated issue for us where there are some problems but we are aware of them. ... I would like to go back to a very important issue. We are all struggling for the independence of our judges, for the independence of our justice system. If the courts hand down a decision, you cannot say the government is responsible for that court decision. The ... independent justice system which hands down a decision. And that is what the courts did in the case of the trials of these homosexuals. And I must say ... for 25 years I was a lawyer at the bar. I know the Senegalese justice system from the inside. ... Over those years there have been three cases where homosexuals were brought before the courts. The first case was an organized homosexual marriage with a lot of fuss, a lot of publicity. The police arrested them and the court case led to an acquittal. The second case of homosexuals related to a foreign national who was already rather elderly who married a young Senegalese boy. And I would like to warn you ... that if an elderly man marries a young boy, the young boy does it so that he can emigrate and go in live in France or some other country abroad, that is the interest of the young person in getting married. This led to a conviction and an appeal was made against the conviction and ... the foreigner was able to leave the country after they were acquitted on appeal. And the third case ... is the case of homosexuals who joined together again with a great deal of fuss, carried out activities which led to disturbances in the neighborhood. The neighbors complained and the police acted. This has already been tried in the first instance, and an appeal has been made against that judgment, and the justice system is now dealing with this case independently on appeal.

2013
The United Nations Human Rights Committee in October 2013 completed a Universal Periodic Review of the human rights situation in Senegal. The following recommendations were made to Senegal (the country that initiated the recommendation is listed in parentheses):

 Amend legislation that results in discriminatory practices, prosecution, and punishment of persons for their sexual orientation or gender identity and adopt education and awareness campaigns to promote tolerance in society (Uruguay)
 Consider adopting necessary measures to achieve nondiscrimination, protection, and integration of the LGBT population (Argentina)
 Effectively implement the principle of non-discrimination, including on grounds of sexual orientation (Austria)
 Amend the Penal Code to decriminalise same sex sexual relations (Belgium, Germany, Ireland, the Netherlands, and Mexico)
 Adopt measures to guarantee that LGBT individuals do not face persecution of any kind (Brazil)
 Repeal the laws that criminalize sexual orientation and gender identity and take concrete measures to protect sexual minorities (Greece)
 Promote respect for human rights of all discriminated groups because of sexual orientation (Paraguay)
 Ensure equal treatment and non-discrimination against lesbian, gay, bisexual, and transgender persons (Thailand)
 Establish a de facto moratorium on Article 319, Penal Code, and ensure that it is not the basis for arbitrary police arrests (Germany)
 Combat the persecution of persons on the basis of their sexual orientation or gender identity (Ireland)
 Start a national dialogue on the acceptance of homosexuality (Netherlands)
 Amend the Penal Code to respect, protect, and enforce the right to non-discrimination regardless of sexual orientation (Switzerland)
 Criminalize violence committed against individuals based on their sexual orientation (Mexico)

Senegal refused to accept these recommendations, explaining that merely being homosexual is not a crime even though same sex sexual acts are.

Sidiki Kaba, the minister of justice of Senegal, said on behalf of the Senegalese delegation on 21 October 2013:

There is no criminalization of homosexuality in Senegal. Article 319 talks about acts contrary to nature. The fact of being homosexual in Senegal is not a crime, and there has been no prosecution or trial of persons who are homosexual under the Criminal Code.

Senegal's obligations under international law and treaties
In March 2010, the United Nations Working Group on Arbitrary Detention found that Senegal's National Police had detained persons who were alleged to have committed "unnatural sexual acts". The group recommended that Senegal, "Pay particular attention to detentions on the grounds of offending decency or public morality, with a view to avoiding any possible discrimination against persons of a different sexual orientation".

Summary table

See also

 Human rights in Africa
 LGBT rights in Africa
 Rama Yade – Franco-Senegalese conservative LGBT rights activist

Notes

References

Further reading 
 Ferguson JL. 2021. “There Is an Eye on Us”: International Imitation, Popular Representation, and the Regulation of Homosexuality in Senegal. American Sociological Review. 

Senegal
LGBT in Senegal
Law of Senegal
Politics of Senegal
Human rights in Senegal